The Ace Cafe is an old transport cafe located near Wembley, North West London, England. Situated next to the North Circular Road, it is historically a notable venue in motorcycle culture. The original cafe opened in 1938 and closed in 1969. It re-opened on the original site in 1997 as a cafe, functions, and entertainment venue.

Location
The Ace Cafe is located on a leg on the western side of the North Circular Road, off the junction with Beresford Avenue. On the A406 it is between the Hanger Lane gyratory and the Wembley A404 junction. It is east of the Alperton neighbourhood, close by Stonebridge and the Park Royal industrial estate.

Apart from the cafe on the original site in London, Ace Cafe London have opened cafes in other countries: Ace Corner Lahti, Finland (opened in June 2011), Ace Cafe Luzern, Switzerland (opened in June 2015), Ace Cafe Beijing, China (opened in July 2015), Ace Cafe Barcelona, Spain (opened in April 2017), and Ace Cafe Orlando, United States of America (opened in May 2017).

History

The Ace Cafe opened in 1938 to accommodate traffic on the then-new A406 road, locally known as the North Circular. It was built on an area between the Grand Union Canal and Stonebridge Park Depot. Because the cafe was open 24 hours a day, it started to attract motorcyclists in the evening and at weekends, becoming popular in the 1950s and 1960s with the Rockers, whereupon Reverend Bill Shergold initially visited to invite them to join the 59 Club.

The cafe was rebuilt in 1949, after a World War II air raid on the nearby Willesden railway marshalling yards had caused extensive damage. Events in the postwar environment made the Ace a success – the emergence of the teenager, an increase in traffic, and the British motorcycle industry at its peak. Young people started to meet at the cafe to socialise, gather their motorcycles, and listen to rock'n'roll on juke boxes. Bands and motorcycle enthusiast groups formed there.

The cafe closed in 1969, shortly after the opening of the Scratchwood Services at what was then the southern end of the M1 motorway. The ground floor of the building became a tyre sales and fitting shop. The first floor was occupied by a vehicle delivery company.

Rocker revival and refurbishment
With increasing popularity of the Rocker revival and discussions with original 59 Club members, the first Ace Cafe reunion was organised by Mark Wilsmore and held in 1994.

The cafe reopened in 1997, with complete refurbishment completed by September 2001. Rockers and motorcyclists from all over the world attend themed meetings. It is no longer open 24-hours but the cafe now has an extensive calendar of events for both motorbike and classic car owners.

It also hosts weekly live music and DJs, and is approved for weddings and civil partnerships.

Film and media 

The Ace Cafe was used as a location in the 1964 film The Leather Boys, Sidney J. Furie's British gay-interest kitchen sink drama, starring Rita Tushingham.

In the past it has been used for the Channel 5 TV programme Fifth Gear in the seasons 10 to 13 (September 2006 until March 2008), and for ITV programme Used Car Roadshow. It has also featured in the BBC television series By Any Means with Charley Boorman; mentioned as a favourite for Ewan McGregor by his wife in the documentary, Long Way Down; and the 2008 film Freebird.

The cafe also featured in an edition of Car SOS – Season 1, Episode 9, presented by Tim Shaw, filmed during 2012 and shown in the UK on at least one TV channel – National Geographic. The episode depicted the secret restoration of a decaying Ford Zodiac Mk1, which was then unveiled and presented to the unsuspecting owner in the car park, close to the building entrance.

Motoring TV presenters Edd China and Mike Brewer filmed at Ace Cafe on a Hot Rod night in early 2014 during a sequence to sell a Chevrolet Camaro, part of Wheeler Dealers series 11.

Awards
The Ace Cafe won London Borough of Brent's "Best Bar None" award for local bars in 2009.

See also
 Biker bar
 List of restaurants in London

Notes

References
Ramsey, Winston. The Ace Cafe Then and Now, 2002. 
Stuart, Johnny; (1987). Rockers!. Plexus Publishing Ltd. 
Duckworth, Mick, (2011). "Ace Times". Redline Books.

External links 

 Company financial report

Biker bars
Restaurants in the London Borough of Brent
Motorcycling subculture in the United Kingdom
Youth culture in the United Kingdom
1938 establishments in England
Restaurants established in 1938
Tourist attractions in the London Borough of Brent
Buildings and structures in the London Borough of Brent